Rumor and Sigh is the seventh solo album by British singer/songwriter Richard Thompson, released in 1991 on the Capitol label. The album was a commercial success for Thompson, and featured his biggest American hit single "I Feel So Good", as well as the fan favourite "1952 Vincent Black Lightning”.

The album earned Thompson a nomination for the Grammy Award for Best Alternative Music Album in 1992.

It was voted number 665 in the third edition of Colin Larkin's All Time Top 1000 Albums (2000).

Songs
The American spelling of the word "Rumor" is due to the fact that Thompson took the title of his album from a posthumously published poem by Archibald MacLeish: "Rumor and sigh of unimagined seas/ Dim radiance of stars that never flamed."

Patrick Humphries described the central character of the song "I Feel So Good" as a ne'er do well who has been freed from prison and expresses his "bullying exultation at his freedom. In an interview, Thompson explained, "If you make someone the subject of a song you're almost inevitably making him a hero. But he obviously isn't. Nor is he an anti-hero. He's no worse than the society that created him. It's a very twentieth century moral dilemma."

"Grey Walls" was inspired by Colney Hatch Mental Hospital in Barnet, North London, which Thompson passed on the bus as a teenager. The song describes the disturbing effect of ECT on psychiatric patients. Thompson has also called the song a comment on the effects of Thatcherism—in the context of closing down mental institutions and selling the facilities for profit.

Thompson has said he was inspired to write "Don't Sit On My Jimmy Shands" after hearing a story of Bob Dylan at a party, hogging the record player so he could play only Robert Johnson recordings. Thompson planned his song as a tongue in cheek tribute to Jimmy Shand, Scottish musician who achieved popularity in the 1930s and 40s by arranging traditional Scottish songs for his accordion band. Shand's music loomed large in Thompson's childhood.

Thompson wrote "Mother Knows Best" to mark the resignation of Margaret Thatcher and express his feelings about the departed Conservative Prime Minister:  "She says 'Bring me your first-born. And I'll suck their blood/ Bring me your poor/ I can trample in the mud'."

Although a teetotaller, Thompson wrote "God Loves A Drunk" to suggest that alcoholism can be a path to spiritual ecstasy. He has described the song as "a swipe at Mormons and Seventh Day Adventists, those people with the polyester suits, those people who are very clean and neat, which means they must be alright with God."

The track "1952 Vincent Black Lightning," despite not being issued as a single, became a fan favourite and is one of Thompson's most highly acclaimed solo compositions. In 2011 Time magazine listed the song in its "All TIME 100 Songs", a list of "the most extraordinary English-language popular recordings since the beginning of TIME magazine in 1923."

Release
The album peaked at number 32 on the UK Albums Chart and was Thompson's first Top 40 album in the UK. The album did not chart in the US, although the lead single "I Feel So Good" peaked at number 15 on the Billboard Modern Rock Tracks chart, his second and highest charting single on that chart. Its follow-up single, "Read About Love" failed to chart.

Two videos, for "I Feel So Good" (animation inspired by the cover artwork) and album track "I Misunderstood" were produced to promote the album. Thompson also promoted the album's American release by performing "I Feel So Good" on Late Night with David Letterman.

The album was nominated for the Grammy Award for Best Alternative Music Album in 1992, but lost to R.E.M.'s Out of Time.

Track listing
All songs written by Richard Thompson.

Personnel

Musicians

Richard Thompson – guitar, vocals, mandolin, hurdy-gurdy
Mitchell Froom – piano, Hammond organ, portative organ, Chamberlin, celeste, clavioline, echo harp 
Jerry Scheff – bass guitar
Mickey Curry – drums (1, 2, 5, 8, 9 & 11)
Jim Keltner – drums
Alex Acuña – percussion
Christine Collister and Clive Gregson  – backing vocals
John Kirkpatrick – accordion, concertina, backing vocals
Phil Pickett – shawm, crumhorn, curtal
Simon Nicol – guitar
Aly Bain – fiddle

Technical
Recording engineer: Dave Leonard; 2nd engineer: Mike Kloster
Overdubs recorded: Lance Phillips, RAK Studios, London and Tchad Blake, Sunset Sound Factory
Mixed: Tchad Blake, Ocean Way Studios, Los Angeles; 2nd engineer: Paula "Max" Garcia
Mastered: Bob Ludwig at Masterdisk
Vincent Motorcycle: kindly loaned by Dick Busby

Artwork
Cover Art: Laura Levine
Photography: Laura Levine
Set Design: Kelly Ray
Art Direction: Tommy Steele
Design: Jeffery Fey

References

Sources

External links
Richard Thompson website: Rumor and Sigh

1991 albums
Richard Thompson (musician) albums
Albums produced by Mitchell Froom
Capitol Records albums